Digital Lows is the debut mixtape by American rapper, Cities Aviv. It was released on May 2, 2011, through Fat Sandwich Records. Produced by various artists including Muted Drone, RPLD GHOSTS and Danny Dee, the mixtape earned attention and critical acclaim from various music publications.

Musical style and production
The beats on the mixtape, which feature chillwave elements, were described as "imaginative but still traditionalist." The track "Black Box" samples Gil Scott-Heron's "Winter in America." The track "Die Young" features a looped sample of Depeche Mode's "People Are People," creating a hybrid style akin to "Rammellzee's avant-rap and Southern fight-rap." The tracks "A Beautiful Hell", "Doom x Gloom", and "sixsixsixes" are influenced by hip hop group Three 6 Mafia. The track "Meet Me on Montrose (For Ex-Lovers Only)" is based on a sample of Alessi Brothers' "Oh Lori" while the track uses a sample from electronic music act Blackbird Blackbird's cover of a Modest Mouse song, "Float On."

While his flow was compared to those of RZA, the album's soul music leanings and storytelling were compared to the works of underground hip hop groups such as The Nonce and Natural Elements.

Critical reception

The mixtape generally received positive reviews. Pitchfork reviewer Brandon Soderberg stated: "Balance is important here, and the darkest moments of Digital Lows soon enough let up to highlight Cities Aviv's most winning quality: his mordant humanity." He also further stated: "Even the usual hip-hop clichés are afforded specificity thanks to his expressive wit and precise determination not to use words in the same exact way as every other rapper." Jon Caramanica of The New York Times described the album as "lullingly pretty."

Accolades

Track listing

Personnel
 Gavin Mays - vocals, lyrics, performance

Producers
 Muted Drone
 RPLD GHOSTS
 Danny Dee
 Upgrayde
 Royal'T
 Blackbird Blackbird

Other personnel
 Matt Qualls - recording
 Drew Ryan - cover art

References

External links
 Cities Aviv - Digital Lows on Bandcamp

2011 debut albums
2011 mixtape albums
Cities Aviv albums
Self-released albums